Darb Alzalaq, is a Kuwaiti television series produced in 1977 .It was written by Abdul Ameer Al-Turki, acted by Abdulhussain Abdulredha, Saad Al Faraj, Khalid Al-Nafisi, Ali Al-Mufidi and Abdulaziz Al Nimsh and directed by Hamdy Farid.

References

Kuwaiti television series
1970s Kuwaiti television series debuts
Year of television series ending missing